The 2016–17 Austrian Cup was the 83rd season of Austria's nationwide football cup competition. It began with a First Round match between FC Karabakh Wien and Rapid Wien on 8 July 2016 and ended on 1 June 2017 with the final at Wörthersee Stadion in Klagenfurt. Red Bull Salzburg were the defending champions.

The cup winners were entitled to participate in the third qualification round of the 2017–18 UEFA Europa League.

Participants 
A total of 64 teams will participate in the competition. Clubs from the 2016–17 Bundesliga and 2016–17 First League are automatically qualified but, as Bundesliga reserve teams could theoretically participate in the First League, may only enter their first team. This means that First League members FC Liefering, while technically an independent entity, will not participate as they are fully controlled by Red Bull Salzburg. The remaining spots were distributed by a fixed scheme to amateur clubs from the nine Austrian regional football associations:
 7 teams: Lower Austria
 6 teams each: Upper Austria, Styria
 5 teams: Vienna
 4 teams each: Burgenland, Carinthia, Salzburg, Tyrol, Vorarlberg
For each regional association, the respective cup winners and, if applicable, losing teams from the relegation play-offs between First League and the Regional Leagues are obliged to participate.

Scheduled dates 
The schedule are as follows:
 First round: 8, 15–17 July 2016
 Second round: 20–21 September 2016
 Third round: 25–26 October 2016
 Quarterfinals: 4–5 April 2017
 Semifinals: 25–26 April 2017
 Final: 1 June 2017 at Klagenfurt

First round 
The draw for this round was conducted on 20 June 2016 in Paris, France. The reason for this rather exceptional place was that all leaders of the Austrian Football Association were in the city due to the UEFA Euro 2016. The matches were drawn by actress and model Davia Martelli.

Matches for this round were determined on regional criteria. The 45 amateur clubs from the Regional Leagues and below were split into two groups, with the Eastern group consisting of 26 teams from Vienna, Lower Austria, Burgenland, Styria and Carinthia and the Western group comprising 19 teams from Upper Austria, Salzburg, Tyrol and Vorarlberg. In a first step, seven matches between members of the Eastern group and six matches among Western group participants were drawn before each of the remaining clubs were paired with one of the professional teams.

Fixtures of this round will be played on 15–17 July 2016 with the exception of the match between FC Karabakh and SK Rapid which had been moved to 8 July 2016 due to the opening of the Allianz Stadion.

(All times given in CEST)

Second round 
(All times given in CEST)

Third round 
(All times given in CEST)

Third round 
(All times given in CEST)

Quarter-finals 
(All times given in CEST)

Semi-finals 
The draw for the semifinals took place on 9 April.
(All times given in CEST)

Final

Details

References

External links 

  

Austrian Cup seasons
Cup
Austrian Cup